The British QF (quick-firing) 6-pounder 10 cwt gun was a 57 mm twin-mount light coast defence and naval gun from the 1930s to 1950s.

Development 
Following the emergence of small fast attack craft during the First World War, it was decided that the British Royal Navy Dockyards were vulnerable to attack by motor torpedo boats which had the speed to evade the heavy coast defence guns which defended them. In 1925, a design was adopted for a twin-barrelled weapon capable of sustained semi-automatic fire. The barrels of the weapon could be fired singly or together. The pedestal mounting and the gun crew were enclosed to the front, sides and top in a reinforced-steel barbette.

The first trials took place in 1928 with production beginning at the Woolwich Ordnance Factory in 1933. Formal War Office acceptance occurred on 28 February 1934. A coastal-defence trial using the gun and barbette was conducted at Culver Battery on the Isle of Wight in 1936. As the shadow of Second World War approached, food equipment and machinery manufacturer, Baker Perkins, was asked to take over production in March 1939; the first guns left its Westwood, Peterborough factory in March 1941. The Mark II version of the QF 6-pounder had a monobloc barrel (made from a single forging) instead of a lined barrel in the Mark Is.

Coast defence 

The first twin 6-pounders were installed at Singapore in 1937. The first UK installation was at Eastern Arm Battery in Dover, just before the outbreak of World War II. Also in 1939, nine pairs of guns were installed in Fort St. Elmo and Fort Ricasoli in the Grand Harbour at Valletta, Malta. These were to play a vital role in the defence against an attack by nineteen Italian MAS fast attack boats on 26 July 1941, when five MAS boats were sunk in less than two minutes. By the end of 1942, 155 of these weapons had been produced for 31 places around the world. The pair installed in 1944 at Fort Rodd Hill at Esquimalt Harbour, British Columbia is thought to be the last in existence.

Naval gun 

One of the problems that persisted throughout the war was surface night attacks by fast E-boats. These would lie in wait for convoy and then at the appropriate moment sweep across the front, firing torpedoes and making a speedy escape into the darkness. The 4.7-inch and 4-inch guns of destroyers could not fire fast enough to deal with this form of attack and the 20 mm Oerlikon cannon did not fire a shell heavy enough to cripple the vessel. A remedy was offered in the form of the twin 6-pounder 10 cwt gun.

For naval use, it was mounted in place of No 1 gun (A mount) on four W class destroyers and proved an effective countermeasure.

Notes and references 
Notes

Citations

Further reading 
 Campbell, John Naval Weapons of World War Two
 H. T. Lenton and J. J. Colledge, Warships of World War II

External links 

 Film of Twin 6 Pounder Coast Artillery gun at practice in Weymouth, 1948 (Pathe)
 Details of the 6pdr Naval and Coastal Gun by Tony DiGiulian
 "Playhouses" Rip Invasion Craft With Twin Six-Pounder Gun March 1944 article
 Westwood Works in World War 2. The Twin 6-pounder Coastal Defence Gun
 

Naval guns of the United Kingdom
57 mm artillery
Coastal artillery
World War II naval weapons of the United Kingdom
Military equipment introduced in the 1930s